Swingadelic is a jazz/blues ensemble founded in 1998 in Hoboken, New Jersey by bassist Dave Post.
 
Alto/tenor sax player Buddy Terry joined the group in 2000 and remained in the band until having a stroke in December 2010 when his duties were taken over by multi-reed player Audrey Welber. Other notables that have performed with Swingadelic are Eddie Gladden, Ronnie Cuber, Virgil Jones, Julio Fernandez, Bill Easley and Michael Hashim.

Discography
Boogie Boo! (MediaMix, 1999)
Organ-ized! (MediaMix, 2002)
Big Band Blues (MediaMix, 2005)
Another Monday Night (MediaMix, 2007)
The Other Duke: Tribute To Duke Pearson (ZOHO Music, 2011)
Toussaintville (ZOHO Music, 2013) with Queen Esther
Mercerville (ZOHO Music, 2017)
Bluesville (ZOHO Music, 2020)

References
Tom Dwyer, Swingadelic at Maxwell's, All About Jazz 2006

Further reading
Zan Stewart, "Swingadelic swings at Maxwell's in Hoboken" nj.com (30 December 2009)
"Swingadelic - The Other Duke: Tribute to Duke Pearson" ejazznews (23 June 2011)
"The Jazz Scene: Flappers and Funk Bands" The Wall Street Journal (22 June 2013)

American jazz ensembles
Musical groups from New Jersey
Musical groups established in 1998